The 1962 Calgary Stampeders finished in 2nd place in the Western Conference with a 9–6–1 record. They were defeated in the Western Finals by the Winnipeg Blue Bombers.

Regular season

Season standings

Season schedule

Playoffs

Cenference Semi-Finals

 Calgary won the total-point series by 43–7. The Stampeders will play the Winnipeg Blue Bombers in the Western Finals.

Conference finals

 Winnipeg wins the best of three series 2–1. The Blue Bombers will advance to the Grey Cup Championship game.

Awards and records
 CFL's Most Outstanding Canadian Award – Harvey Wylie (DB)

1962 CFL All-Stars
QB – Eagle Day, CFL All-Star
RB – Earl Lunsford, CFL All-Star
OG – Tony Pajaczkowski, CFL All-Star
DT – Don Luzzi, CFL All-Star
LB – Wayne Harris, CFL All-Star
DB – Harvey Wylie, CFL All-Star

References

Calgary Stampeders seasons
1962 Canadian Football League season by team